Qezel Bolagh (also Romanized as Qezel Bolāgh; also known as Ghezel Bolagh and Qizil Bulāq) is a village in Zarrineh Rud Rural District, Bizineh Rud District, Khodabandeh County, Zanjan Province, Iran. At the 2006 census, its population was 682, in 143 families.

References 

Populated places in Khodabandeh County